was a lieutenant general in the Imperial Japanese Army in World War II, who is noted for his role in the Battle of Manila during the final days of World War II.

Biography
Yokoyama was born in Fukuoka Prefecture as the eldest son of a village mayor. He graduated from the 24th class of the Imperial Japanese Army Academy in 1912 and the 37th class of the  Army Staff College in 1925. His rise through the ranks was steady and rapid, serving in mostly staff and administrative posts within the Chosen Army and Imperial Japanese Army General Staff. aside from a brief combat deployment during the Japanese intervention in Siberia and an observation tour in Europe in 1934. He was as appointed commander of the Kwantung Army's Railway Zone serving in that post until 1937. 

With the start of the Second Sino-Japanese War, Yokoyama was appointed commander of the IJA 2nd Infantry Regiment from March 1938 to March 1939, whereupon he was promoted to major general. He was assigned command of the 2nd Field Railway, followed by the 1st Field Railway until his promotion to  lieutenant general in 1941. In June 1942, Yokoyama was assigned command of the Manchukuo-based IJA 8th Division, which was garrisoned in eastern Heilongjiang guarding the border with the Soviet Union.  However, in 1944, as the situation in the Pacific war continued to deteriorate for the Japanese, portions of the IJA 8th Division were sent to Truk, where they were largely annihilated by lack of food and American air raids. The remainder of the division was transferred from Manchukuo to the Philippines under the command of General Yamashita Tomoyuki's 14th Area Army, and under the name of  “Shimbu Group”, was wholly made responsible for the defense of southern Luzon. Suffering severe casualties, the remnants of the command was assigned to the IJA 41st Army in March 1945. Yokoyama was responsible for  defending Manila against the U.S. Sixth and Eighth Armies from 3 February until his surrender on 4 March 1945, by which time his army had been reduced to just 6500 men.

At the end of the war, Yokoyama was arrested, taken before a military tribunal in Manila, and charged with war crimes due to the various atrocities committed by Japanese forces during the Japanese defense of Manila. He was found guilty and sentenced to death. However, Yokoyama's death sentence was never carried out. In July 1953, Yokoyama's death sentence was commuted by President Elpidio Quirino and he was allowed to return to Japan. Yokoyama served another six months at Sugamo Prison before being pardoned entirely in December 1953. In an interview done after his pardon and before his return to Japan, Yokoyama accepted responsibility for what he had allowed to happen and said, "The memory of the destruction and murder committed in the Philippines will remain with me as a nightmare that I will carry to my grave..." He died in 1961.

References

External links

 Time Magazine article on Yokoyama's pardon

Footnotes 

1890 births
1961 deaths
Imperial Japanese Army generals of World War II
Military personnel from Fukuoka Prefecture
Members of the Kwantung Army
Japanese people convicted of war crimes
Japanese prisoners sentenced to death
Japanese people imprisoned abroad
Recipients of Philippine presidential pardons
Prisoners sentenced to death by the Philippines